Chevroux may refer to:

Chevroux, Ain, a commune of the Ain department, France
Chevroux, Switzerland, a municipality of the Canton of Vaud